Baron Braybrooke, of Braybrooke in the County of Northampton, is a title in the Peerage of Great Britain. It was created in 1788 for John Griffin, 4th Baron Howard de Walden, with remainder to his kinsman Richard Neville-Aldworth. Lord Howard de Walden was the son of William Whitwell and Anne Griffin, daughter of James Griffin, 2nd Baron Griffin of Braybrooke, who was the son of Edward Griffin, 1st Baron Griffin of Braybrooke, and his wife Lady Essex Howard, eldest daughter of James Howard, 3rd Earl of Suffolk and 3rd Baron Howard de Walden.

In 1749 Whitwell assumed the surname of Griffin, and the same year he was elected to Parliament for Andover, a seat he held until 1784. The latter year the barony of Howard de Walden, which had been in abeyance since the death of his great-great-grandfather the third Earl of Suffolk in 1689, was called out of abeyance in favour of him, and he was summoned to the House of Lords as the fourth Baron Howard de Walden. Moreover, the barony of Griffin of Braybrooke held by his maternal ancestors had become extinct on the death of his uncle, the third Baron, in 1743. In 1788 the Braybrooke title was revived when Griffin was created Baron Braybrooke.

History
On Lord Braybrooke and Howard de Walden's death in 1797, the barony of Howard de Walden again fell into abeyance (it was called out of abeyance in 1799; see the Baron Howard de Walden). He was succeeded in the barony of Braybrooke according to the special remainder by his kinsman Richard Neville-Aldworth, the second Baron. He also inherited the family seat of Audley End in Essex, to add to his own at Billingbear Park in Berkshire. The same year he succeeded in the barony, Neville-Aldworth assumed by Royal Licence the surname of Griffin for himself, his eldest son and one of his daughters (one of his younger sons was George Neville-Grenville, Dean of Windsor). He had previously represented Grampound, Buckingham and Reading in Parliament and later served as Lord Lieutenant of Essex. Lord Braybrooke was the husband of Catherine Grenville, daughter of the former Prime Minister George Grenville.

Their eldest son, the third Baron, sat in the House of Commons as a representative for Thirsk, Saltash, Buckingham and Berkshire.

Latimer Neville, 6th Baron Braybrooke was Master of Magdalene College, Cambridge for over 50 years from 1853–1904 (a record unlikely ever to be surpassed), but described as "a good but dull man lacking intellectual powers.".

Lieutenant Richard, 8th Baron Braybroke, Grenadier Guards, was killed on active service in Tunisia on 23 January 1943, and is buried in the Medjez el Bab Commonwealth War Graves Cemetery.

The tenth Baron, who succeeded his father in 1990, served as Lord Lieutenant of Essex from 1992 to 2000.  Lord Braybrooke was awarded an Honorary Doctorate from the University of Essex in July 2000. Lord Braybrooke had eight daughters but no sons.

In 2017, the title was inherited by the tenth Baron's third cousin twice removed, Richard Neville, born in 1977. The eleventh Baron is a great-great-great-grandson of George Neville-Grenville, Dean of Windsor, third son of the second Baron.

The family seat of Billingbear House burnt down in 1924. In 1948, Audley End house (but not the estate and contents) was sold, while creating the incorporeal hereditament right to repurchase, to the Ministry of Works and later came into the care of English Heritage. The Barons Braybrooke remain the  hereditary visitors of Magdalene College, Cambridge.

Barons Braybrooke (1788–)

  John Griffin Griffin, 1st Baron Braybrooke (1719–1797) (also  4th Baron Howard de Walden)
 Richard Neville (1750–1825) (kinsman of the 1st Baron)
  Richard Griffin, 2nd Baron Braybrooke (1750–1825) (kinsman of the 1st Baron, succeeded according to special remainder)
 Hon. Henry Neville (?–1809)
  Richard Griffin, 3rd Baron Braybrooke (1783–1858)
  Richard Cornwallis Neville, 4th Baron Braybrooke (1820–1861)
  Charles Cornwallis Neville, 5th Baron Braybrooke (1823–1902)
 Hon. Henry Aldworth Neville (1824–1854)
  Latimer Neville, 6th Baron Braybrooke (1827–1904)
  Henry Neville, 7th Baron Braybrooke (1855–1941)
  Richard Henry Cornwallis Neville, 8th Baron Braybrooke (1918–1943)
 Hon. George Robert Latimer Neville (1920–1941)
 Hon. Grey Neville (1857–1920)
  Henry Seymour Neville, 9th Baron Braybrooke (1897–1990)
  Robin Henry Charles Neville, 10th Baron Braybrooke (1932–2017)
 Hon. Amanda Muriel Mary Neville (1962–)
  Hon. Caroline Emma Neville (1963–)
 Henrietta Jane Neville (1965–1980)
 Hon. Victoria Neville (1970–)
 Hon. Arabella Neville (1970–)
 Hon. Sara Lucy Neville (1975–)
 Hon. Emma Charlotte Neville (1979–)
 Hon. Lucinda Octavia Neville (1984–)
 Hon. Grey Aldworth Neville (1900–1985)
 Hon. Grey Neville (1830–1854)
  Hon. George Neville-Grenville (1789–1854)
 Ralph Neville-Grenville (1817–1886)
 Robert Neville-Grenville (1846–1936)
 George Neville (1850–1923)
 Ralph Neville (1887–1936)
 Richard Neville (1922–1980)
 Philip Lloyd Neville (1888–1976)
 George Neville (1943–2004)
  Richard Ralph Neville, 11th Baron Braybrooke (1977–)
 (1) Hon. Edward Alfred Neville (2015–)
 (2) John Neville (1944–)
 (3) Edward Grey Neville (1982–)
 Alfred Geoffrey Neville (1891–1955)
 Hugh Neville-Grenville (1851–1938)
 Louis Neville-Grenville (1852–1919)
 Betram Neville-Grenville (1880–1950)
 Claud Neville-Grenville (1858–1944)
 Edward Neville-Grenville (1904–1988)
 Percy Neville-Grenville (1868–1917)
 William Frederick Neville (1818–1882)
 William Neville (1850–1939)

The heir apparent is the present holder's son, Hon. Edward Alfred Neville (b. 2015)
The heir apparent's heir presumptive is the present holder's uncle, John Neville (b. 1944)

Arms

See also
Baron Howard de Walden
Earl of Suffolk
George Neville-Grenville, Dean of Windsor
Ralph Neville-Grenville, Conservative MP

Notes

References 

Kidd, Charles, Williamson, David (editors). Debrett's Peerage and Baronetage (1990 edition). New York: St Martin's Press, 1990, 

Lord Braybrooke

Baronies in the Peerage of Great Britain
Neville family
Noble titles created in 1788
Peerages created with special remainders